The 1996–97 Danish Superliga season was the 7th season of the Danish Superliga league championship, governed by the Danish Football Association. It took place from the first match on July 28, 1996, to final match on June 15, 1997.

The Danish champions qualified for the UEFA Champions League 1997-98 qualification, while the second and third placed teams qualified for the second qualification round of the UEFA Cup 1997-98. The fourth to sixth placed teams qualified for the UEFA Intertoto Cup 1997, while the two lowest placed teams of the tournament was directly relegated to the Danish 1st Division. Likewise, the Danish 1st Division champions and runners-up were promoted to the Superliga.

Table

Results

Top goal scorers

See also
 1996-97 in Danish football

External links
  Fixtures at NetSuperligaen.dk
  Peders Fodboldstatistik

Danish Superliga seasons
1996–97 in Danish football
Denmark